New York, Fall 1974 is an album by the American jazz saxophonist Anthony Braxton, recorded in 1974 and released on the Arista label. The album was subsequently included on The Complete Arista Recordings of Anthony Braxton released by Mosaic Records in 2008.

Reception
The Allmusic review by Scott Yanow awarded the album 4 stars stating, "The wide amount of variety on this set makes this album a perfect introduction to Anthony Braxton's potentially forbidding but logical music."

Track listing
All compositions by Anthony Braxton.

   (Composition 23 B) - 8:50 
   (Composition 23 C) - 3:07 
    (Composition 23 D) - 7:03 
  (Composition 37) - 8:18 
  (Composition 23 A) - 5:29 
  (Composition 38 A) - 6:33 

Recorded at Generation Sound Studios in New York on September 27 (tracks 1-5) and October 16 (track 6), 1974

Personnel
Anthony Braxton - sopranino saxophone, alto saxophone, clarinet, contrabass clarinet, flute
Kenny Wheeler - trumpet, flugelhorn (tracks 1-3 & 6)
Dave Holland - double bass (tracks 1-3 & 6)
Jerome Cooper - drums (tracks 1-3 & 6)
Richard Teitelbaum - Moog synthesizer (track 4)
Julius Hemphill - alto saxophone (track 5)
Oliver Lake - tenor saxophone (track 5)
Hamiet Bluiett - baritone saxophone (track 5)
Leroy Jenkins - violin (track 6)

References

Arista Records albums
Anthony Braxton albums
1975 albums
Albums produced by Michael Cuscuna